Manganese(III) oxide is a chemical compound with the formula Mn2O3.  It occurs in nature as the mineral bixbyite (recently changed to bixbyite-(Mn)) and is used in the production of ferrites and thermistors.

Preparation and chemistry
Heating MnO2 in air at below 800 °C produces α-Mn2O3 (higher temperatures produce Mn3O4). γ-Mn2O3 can be produced by oxidation followed by dehydration of manganese(II) hydroxide. Many preparations of nano-crystalline Mn2O3 have been reported, for example syntheses involving oxidation of MnII salts or reduction of MnO2.

Manganese(III) oxide is formed by the redox reaction in an alkaline cell:

 2 MnO2 + Zn → Mn2O3 + ZnO

Manganese(III) oxide Mn2O3 must not be confused with MnOOH manganese(III) oxyhydroxide. Contrary to Mn2O3, MnOOH is a compound that decomposes at about 300 °C to form MnO2.

Structure
Mn2O3 is unlike many other transition metal oxides in that it does not adopt the corundum (Al2O3) structure. Two forms are generally recognized, α-Mn2O3 and γ-Mn2O3, although a high pressure form with the CaIrO3 structure has been reported too.

α-Mn2O3 has the cubic bixbyite structure, which is an example of a C-type rare earth sesquioxide (Pearson symbol cI80, space group Ia, #206). The bixbyite structure has been found to be stabilised by the presence of
small amounts of Fe3+, pure Mn2O3 has an orthorhombic structure (Pearson symbol oP24, space group Pbca, #61). α-Mn2O3 undergoes antiferromagnetic transition at 80 K. 

γ-Mn2O3 has a structure related to the spinel structure of Mn3O4 where the oxide ions are cubic close packed. This is similar to the relationship between γ-Fe2O3 and Fe3O4. γ-Mn2O3 is ferrimagnetic with a Néel temperature of 39 K.

ε-Mn2O3 takes on a rhombohedral ilmenite structure (the first binary compound known to do so), wherein the manganese cations divided equally into oxidation states 2+ and 4+. ε-Mn2O3 is antiferromagnetic with a Néel temperature of 210 K.

References

Manganese(III) minerals
Sesquioxides
Transition metal oxides